Szenes is a Hungarian surname. Notable people with the surname include:

Árpád Szenes (1897–1985), Hungarian painter
Hannah Szenes (1921–1944), Hungarian Jewish resistance member
István Szenes, Hungarian figure skater
Zoltán Szenes (born 1951), Hungarian military officer

Hungarian-language surnames
Jewish surnames